Christ Church is in Ince Green Lane, Lower Ince, Ince-in-Makerfield, Greater Manchester, England.  It is an active Anglican parish church in the deanery of Wigan, the archdeaconry of Warrington, and the diocese of Liverpool.  Its benefice is combined with that of St Catharine, Wigan. The church is recorded in the National Heritage List for England as a designated Grade II listed building.

History
The church was built between 1861 and 1864 to a design by the Lancaster architect E. G. Paley. When originally planned in 1860 it had been intended to seat 700 people. This was amended the following year to a church seating 677 at an estimated cost of £5,000 (equivalent to £ in ).

Architecture

Christ Church is constructed in rock-faced stone with ashlar dressings, and has a slate roof.  Its plan consists of a five-bay nave, north and south transepts, a chancel ending in a polygonal apse, north and south vestries, and a porch at the west end.  To the east of the north transept is a turret.  In the nave there are two-light windows containing plate tracery. Above the porch at the west end is a four-light window with Geometric tracery, and a small single-light window above it.  The transepts contain wheel windows with plate tracery.  The windows in the chancel have two lights with Geometrical tracery. The stained glass in the west window, dating from 1893, is by F. Holt.

See also

Listed buildings in Ince-in-Makerfield
List of ecclesiastical works by E. G. Paley
List of churches in Greater Manchester

References

External links

Church of England church buildings in Greater Manchester
Anglican Diocese of Liverpool
Grade II listed churches in the Metropolitan Borough of Wigan
Gothic Revival church buildings in England
Gothic Revival architecture in Greater Manchester
Churches completed in 1864
19th-century Church of England church buildings
Church buildings by E. G. Paley